Olivia Morris (born 29 January 1997) is an English actress. She is known for her roles in the Indian film RRR (2022) and the BritBox series Hotel Portofino (2022).

Early life
Olivia Morris was born on 29 January 1997. She is from Kingston-upon-Thames, Greater London. Morris joined the National Youth Theatre and went on to train at the Royal Welsh College of Music and Drama.

Career
Morris appeared in the music video for the song "London's Blues" by Ferris & Sylvester. In 2022, she made her television debut as Alice Mays-Smith in the 2022 period drama Hotel Portofino, which premiered on BritBox, and film debut as Jennifer "Jenny" in the Indian film RRR directed by S. S. Rajamouli. She has joined the cast of HBO Asia's The Head for its second season.

Filmography

Films

Music video

See also

References

External links 
 
 
 

Year of birth missing (living people)
Place of birth missing (living people)
Living people
21st-century English actresses
Actresses from London
Actresses in Telugu cinema
English expatriates in India
British expatriate actresses in India
European actresses in India
Actresses of European descent in Indian films
Alumni of the Royal Welsh College of Music & Drama
National Youth Theatre members
People from the Royal Borough of Kingston upon Thames